This article summarizes healthcare in Texas.  In 2017, the United Healthcare Foundation ranked Texas as the 34th healthiest state in the United States. Obesity, excessive drinking, maternal mortality, infant mortality, and vaccinations are among the major public health issues facing Texas.

Issues

Obesity
Obesity has quickly become a major health issue in Texas. In 2017, 33.6% of Texas adults were obese as compared to 29.9% of U.S. adults. In 2000 21.7% of adults were obese and in 1990 only 10.7% of adults were obese. In 2016, 33% of 10-17 year olds in Texas were obese. When separated out by gender, 34.6% of Texas females and 32.8% of Texas males were obese. When separated out by race, 31% of White adults, 41.7% of Black adults, and 37.8% of Hispanic adults were obese in Texas in 2016. Research shows that an increase in household income is correlated with a decrease in obesity rates. In 2014, Comptroller Susan Combs found that there are educational achievement patterns as well - 39% of the Texas population with less than a high school education was obese while only 23% of college graduates were obese. Living in a rural area in Texas is also correlated with higher obesity rates.

Consequences of obesity 
Obesity causes several chronic diseases including heart disease and diabetes. The three leading causes of death in Texas - heart disease, stroke, and cancer - are all linked to obesity. Additionally, obesity can cause type 2 diabetes, arteriosclerosis, and hypertension. In 2010, Texas saw 1,261,654 cases of heart disease and is predicted to see 5,688,482 cases in 2030. In 2010, Texas saw 1,962,059 cases of diabetes and is predicted to see 2,851,697 cases in 2030. In 2010, Texas saw 4,300,252 cases of hypertension and is predicted to see 5,689,509 cases in 2030. In 2010, Texas saw 328,379 cases of obesity-related cancer and is predicted to see 810,806 cases in 2030.

Obesity also has substantial impacts on the economy in Texas. Obesity costs Texas businesses $9.5 billion annually. 41% of this is due to obesity-related healthcare costs, 17% is due to absenteeism, and 37% is due to presenteeism.

Obesity treatment 
Effective treatment for obesity is known to be expensive and difficult. For childhood obesity, programs tend to focus on creating lifestyle changes including a healthier diet and more exercise. Studies show that obesity treatment for children should aim more at changing the behavior of the family as a whole, especially the parents. Comprehensive weight loss programs for children in Texas have had limited success in reducing weight. For example, only 20% of children finish the Weigh of Life Program and many of them are likely to gain the weight back later on. For adults, surgery is an effective long-term treatment but it comes with several risks and complications.

Obesity prevention 
Environmental factors play a large role in obesity rates. Studies have shown that people who live in the same socioeconomic contexts in Texas, regardless of race, tend to have similar rates of obesity. Generally speaking, encouraging healthy habits, raising awareness, and educating people about portion sizes and nutritious requirements can help prevent obesity. Childhood prevention is key - a child who was overweight at 12 years of age has a 75% chance of being overweight as an adult.

Obesity policy 

In 2003, the Texas School Nutrition Policy Launch set nutrition standards with the intentions of discouraging obesity. This policy lowered the availability of foods of minimal nutritional value in schools, limited portion sizes, limited trans fats, and limited fried foods. Texas has also required early childhood education programs to encourage breastfeeding, provide drinking water access, and provide daily physical activity. The state also has a fund specifically for financing healthy food. In 2013, the Obesity Prevention Program was created after merging the Nutrition, Physical Activity, and Obesity Prevention (NPAOP) and Worksite Wellness Programs. This program supports healthy eating, physical activity, and policies that promote healthier lifestyles.

Alcohol use
The most commonly abused substance in Texas is alcohol. The rate of binge drinking in males in Texas is comparable to that of males in the United States. In 2017, 22.4% of adult males in Texas reported binge drinking, as compared to 22.1% of males in the United States. Less than 12% of females adults in Texas reported binge drinking. Alcohol abuse and alcoholism can lead to a variety of health issues including liver damage, heart problems, cancer, and depression. Further, 61% of high school students in Texas have tried alcohol and 17% of Texas high school students had their first drink before the age of 13. Based on 2016-2017 surveys, it was estimated that in Texas on average each year over a million individuals 12 years old or older had an alcohol use disorder in the last year.

Alcohol policy
The Texas Ignition Interlock Law went into effect during September 2015. This law requires judges to order ignition interlocks for all drunk-drivers with a Blood Alcohol Level of 0.15% or greater. Since the passing of this law, the drunk driving related death rate in Texas has decreased by 8.5%.

Maternal health

Texas has the highest maternal mortality rate in the developed world, and the rate by which Texas women died from pregnancy related complications doubled from 2010 to 2014, to 23.8 per 100,000. A rate unmatched in any other U.S. state or economically developed country.

Infant health
Texas has the seventh highest birth rate in the United States, with nearly 400,000 babies born each year. Over half of all Texas births are paid by Medicaid, totaling over $2.2 billion per year in birth and delivery-related services for mothers and infants. Studies have found that infant mortality is usually caused by birth defects, pre-term birth, low birth weight, Sudden Infant Death Syndrome, and pregnancy complications. The average amount spent in the first year of life for a preterm birth with major complications (excluding extreme prematurity) is $19,059, and $4,019 for a preterm birth without major complications compared to $410 for an uncomplicated, term birth.

Rates of infant mortality
For decades the infant mortality rate in Texas was higher than the nationwide rate but that gap has slowly closed. In 2017, the infant mortality rate in Texas was identical to the nationwide rate: 5.9 deaths per 1,000 live births. This rate is not identical across the state of Texas and studies have found significant disparities between zip codes. For example, the 76164 zip code has an infant mortality rate of 12.3 deaths per 1,000 live births while the neighboring 76107 zip code has a rate of 1.8 deaths per 1,000 live births. Additionally, Black families in Texas are disproportionately burdened by these rates. In 2015, the infant mortality rate for Black babies in Texas was 10.9 deaths per 1,000 births. These disparities can be explained by factors such as socioeconomic status, air pollution, and access to health care.

Preterm birth
A birth is considered preterm when it takes place more than 3 weeks before the estimated due date. Preterm birth rates in Texas are consistently higher than the nationwide rate. In 2016, 10.4% of live births in Texas were preterm. The rate for Black mothers specifically was elevated - 13.6%. Numerous factors have been associated with premature birth, including lack of prenatal care,  race, obesity, smoking, and even air pollution.

Low birth weight

A low birth weight is less than 2500 grams. The rate of low birth weight in Texas has always been higher than the nationwide rate. In 2016, 8.4% of live births in Texas had a low birth weight. The rate for Black mothers specifically was 13.5%. Babies of mothers who do not get prenatal care are 3 times more likely to have a low birth weight and 5 times more likely to die than those born to mothers who do get care. As for long-term complications, low birth weight babies are at a higher risk for cerebral palsy, blindness, deafness, and developmental delay.

Prenatal care
Prenatal care is the best way to prevent preterm births and low birth weight babies.  Unfortunately, in 2016 only 65% of pregnant women in Texas had access to prenatal care in their first trimester. Women being unaware of their pregnancies, economic hardship due to inability to work during pregnancy, lack of knowledge or access to health services, and difficulty finding transportation are contributing factors to this alarmingly low rate. Texas has also seen significant disparities in who receives prenatal care - 75% of White women and only 55% of Black women received prenatal care during their first trimester. Although women covered by Medicaid are supposed to automatically transition into the Healthy Texas Women program for postpartum coverage, this transition does not always take place.

Abortion services

In 2017 the Guttmacher Institute reported that 96% of Texas counties had no clinics that provided abortions.  Private insurance policies and the Affordable Care Act only cover abortion in cases of life endangerment or severely compromised physical health.  Most women must receive counseling including information that is designed to discourage them from having an abortion, they must then wait 24 hours meaning they must make two trips to the facility which may entail missing two days of work, paying for the trip to the facility and the cost of an over night stay at the site of the abortion clinic.  The working poor may not be able to cover the costs of abortion; the Guttmacher Institute called these  requirements "unnecessary and burdensome."  In May 2021, Texas passed an abortion bill that will ban abortion from as early as six weeks, before many women realize that they are pregnant.  The ban includes women or girls who become pregnant by incest or rape.  The bill came into effect in September 2021.

Vaccinations
In 2017, 67.8% of children age 35 months in Texas completed the recommended vaccination schedule. The highest individual vaccine rate was for the polio virus: 93.1% of children age 35 months in Texas received this vaccine. The lowest individual vaccine rate was for hepatitis A: 62.6% of children age 35 months in Texas received this vaccine. Some children are under-vaccinated due to issues with accessing preventative care, vaccine delivery, or parental choice. The state has started to implement ImmTrac, a free vaccination record system.

Vaccination policy
In 2013, Texas passed legislation that requires employees of child-care facilities to have certain vaccinations, unless the employee objects for reasons of conscience. Texas has allowed for parents to exempt their children from vaccines by citing medical reasons since 1972. Further, Texas has allowed for parents to exempt their children from vaccines on the basis of religious belief since 2003.

Medical research
Texas has many research medical centers. The state has nine medical schools, three dental schools, and two optometry schools. Texas has two Biosafety Level 4 (BSL-4) laboratories: one at The University of Texas Medical Branch (UTMB) in Galveston, and the other at the Southwest Foundation for Biomedical Research in San Antonio—the first privately owned BSL-4 lab in the United States.

The Texas Medical Center in Houston, holds the world's largest concentration of research and healthcare institutions, with 47 member institutions. Texas Medical Center performs the most heart transplants in the world. The University of Texas M. D. Anderson Cancer Center in Houston is a highly regarded academic institution that centers around cancer patient care, research, education and prevention.

San Antonio's South Texas Medical Center facilities rank sixth in clinical medicine research impact in the United States. The University of Texas Health Science Center is another highly ranked research and educational institution in San Antonio.

Both the American Heart Association and the University of Texas Southwestern Medical Center call Dallas home. The Southwestern Medical Center ranks "among the top academic medical centers in the world". The institution's medical school employs the most medical school Nobel laureates in the world.

Legislative responses
The Trust for America's Health ranked Texas 15th highest in adult obesity, with 27.2 percent of the state's population measured as obese. The 2008 Men's Health obesity survey ranked four Texas cities among the top 25 fattest cities in America; Houston ranked 6th, Dallas 7th, El Paso 8th, and Arlington 14th. Texas had only one city, Austin, ranked 21st, in the top 25 among the "fittest cities" in America. The same survey has evaluated the state's obesity initiatives favorably with a "B+". The state is ranked forty-second in the percentage of residents who engage in regular exercise.

Notwithstanding the concentration of elite medical centers in the state, The Commonwealth Fund ranks the Texas healthcare system the third worst in the nation. Texas ranks close to last in access to healthcare, quality of care, avoidable hospital spending, and equity among various groups. Causes of the state's poor rankings include politics, a high poverty rate, and the highest rate of illegal immigration in the nation. In May 2006, Texas initiated the program "code red" in response to the report the state had 25.1 percent of the population without health insurance, the largest proportion in the nation. Research shows that adolescents who see alcohol use in advertisements, television shows, and movies are more likely to start drinking alcohol at a younger age. Drinking at a young age is correlated with long-term alcohol abuse.

Texas Department of State Health Services

The Texas Department of State Health Services manages state government projects in Texas.

The health insurance marketplace for Texas is HealthCare.gov, which is also the federal marketplace usable by anyone.

Hospitals in Texas

Texas has hospitals serving every part of the state.

Healthcare by region

Dallas, Texas

Dallas, Texas offers healthcare services.

Galveston, Texas

Galveston, Texas offers healthcare services.

Houston, Texas

Houston, Texas offers healthcare services.

Lubbock, Texas

Lubbock, Texas offers healthcare services.

San Antonio, Texas

San Antonio, Texas offers healthcare services.

References

External links
Texas Department of State Health Services
100 things to know about healthcare in Texas
AHRQ case studies